Bhor taluka is a taluka in Haveli subdivision of Pune district of state of Maharashtra in India.

See also
 Talukas in Pune district

References

Talukas in Pune district
Talukas in Maharashtra